The 2010 Coastal Carolina Chanticleers football team represented Coastal Carolina University in the 2010 NCAA Division I FCS football season. The Chanticleers were led by eighth-year head coach David Bennett and played their home games at Brooks Stadium. Coastal Carolina competed as a member of the Big South Conference. They finished the season 6–6 with a 5–1 record in conference play and were conference co-champions with Liberty and Stony Brook. The Chanticleers received the Big South's automatic bid to compete in the FCS playoffs, where they lost to Western Illinois in the first round. Coastal Carolina played a five-overtime game against Towson on September 11, the longest in school history.

Schedule

References

Coastal Carolina
Coastal Carolina Chanticleers football seasons
Big South Conference football champion seasons
Coastal Carolina
Coastal Carolina Chanticleers football